Zangguy is a township in Guma County in the Hotan Prefecture of Xinjiang, in northwestern China. According to the 2006 Chinese census, the township has a population of 13,027 people and covers 855 square kilometres.

History

In 1958, Xingfu Commune was established.

In 1978, Xingfu Commune was renamed Zangguy Commune.

In 1984, Zangguy Commune became Zangguy Township.

Geography
It is surrounded by the Taklamakan Desert and has a flat, dry continental climate, with an average annual temperature of 11.6 °C. The average temperature in July, the hottest month is 24.9 °C, with the coldest average temperature of -6 °C in January.

Administrative divisions
Zangguy Township has jurisdiction over 11 village committees.

Residential community (Mandarin Chinese Hanyu Pinyin-derived names):
 Jinhui
Villages:
 Kule'airike, Yaboyi, Yingqikai'airike, Ya, Tatirang, Langan, Yingwusitang, Bulake, Kumuboyi, Aqikashi, Kulebixi
Other areas:
 Yamanya

Economy
2.84 million mu of the township is under cultivation, mainly producing wheat, maize, cotton, oilseeds and pulses, fruits and vegetables, barley and alfalfa. Animal husbandry and rearing of sheep, cattle, horses, camels and donkeys is also practised.

Transportation
 China National Highway 315

Notes

References

External links
Hudong Encyclopedia 

Populated places in Xinjiang
Township-level divisions of Xinjiang